Corsa may also refer to:
 Corsa (moth), a genus of moth
 Chevrolet Corsa, sports variant of the US Chevrolet Corvair automobile
 Opel Corsa, a German automobile model, also marketed as the Chevrolet Corsa or Vauxhall Corsa.
 Toyota Corsa, alternate name of the Japanese Toyota Tercel automobile
 CORSA-b, alternate name of the Hakucho Japanese astronomical satellite
 Corsa Specialised Vehicles

See also
 Corse (disambiguation)
 Corsica (disambiguation)
 Corsican (disambiguation)